The German standard DIN 66303 is a character set standard, which is used for character encoding in computer systems. The standard DIN 66303 bears the title "Information Technology: 8-Bit-Code" and was established in November 1986 (DIN 66303:1986-11). The most recent edition is from June 2000 (DIN 66303:2000-06).

The character set of the 2000 edition (DIN 66303:2000-06) corresponds in layout and repertoire to the international standard ISO/IEC 8859-1. The still often-used forerunner DIN 66303:1986-11 specified two code pages, the General Reference Version of the 8-Bit-Code (ARV8) and the German Reference Version of the 8-Bit-Code (DRV8).

DRV8 is an extension of DIN 66003 (the German adaptation of ISO/IEC 646) with European characters, whereas ARV8 represents a re-arrangement of the DIN 66003 characters to their internationally used (ISO-8859-1 or DEC MCS) code points.

Tables for the 1986 edition

DIN 66303:1986-11 – German Reference Version of the 8-bit Code (DRV8) 

The DRV8 code corresponds to ISO-8859-1 with certain characters swapped, such as to make it an extension of DIN 66003 as opposed to of ASCII.

DIN 66303:1986-11 – General Reference Version of the 8-Bit-Code (ARV8) 

The name "ARV8" is associated with ISO-8859-1 without rearrangement. Shown below is the common subset of the Latin parts of ISO 8859, which corresponds to the definition of ARV8 in the 1986 edition of DIN 66303.

References

Character encoding
ISO/IEC 8859
66303